Anton Friesen (born 15 June 1985) is a German politician for the populist Alternative for Germany (AfD) and from 2017 to 2021 member of the Bundestag, the federal legislative body.

Life and achievements

Friesen was born 1985 in Uspenka, Kazakhstan and studied political science at the Otto-Suhr-Institut of the Free University of Berlin from 2005 to 2011.

Friesen entered the newly founded populist AfD in 2013 and became member of the bundestag in 2017.

Friesen denies the scientific consensus on climate change.

References

Living people
1985 births
Members of the Bundestag 2017–2021
Members of the Bundestag for the Alternative for Germany